Cory's Brook is a tributary of the Passaic River that has its source in Warren, New Jersey and forms the boundary of Union County, New Jersey. The brook forms a pond at the East County Park in Warren Township.

See also
List of New Jersey rivers

Tributaries of the Passaic River
Rivers of New Jersey
Rivers of Union County, New Jersey